Schizochlamydella is a genus of green algae in the class Trebouxiophyceae.

References

External links

Oocystaceae
Trebouxiophyceae genera
Trebouxiophyceae